The 2010 Oceania Handball Championship was the seventh edition of the Oceania Handball Nations Cup, which took place in Porirua, New Zealand from 8 to 10 May 2010. By winning, Australia secured the Oceania bid for the 2011 World Men's Handball Championship in Sweden. The tournament was held as a double round robin. Participating nations were Australia, New Zealand and the Cook Islands.

Table

Results
All times are local (UTC+12).

References

 Report on International Handball Federation web page. 22 January, 2011

External links

2011 WC Qualification (Men), Team Handball News
Stats on Tudor.com

Oceania men championship
Oceania Handball Championship
2010 in New Zealand sport
International handball competitions hosted by New Zealand
May 2010 sports events in New Zealand